Newroz Sport Club, is an Iraqi football team based in Sulaymaniyah, that plays in Iraqi Premier League.

History

2019–20 season
In the 2019 season, the Kurdistan Football Association announced the cancellation of the Kurdistan Premier League due to the COVID-19 pandemic. They considered Newroz to be the league champion for this season, because they were at the top of the league standings until that time, where they played 15 matches, won 7, drew 5 and lost 3 matches, and collected 26 points.

2020–21 season
Newroz participated in the Iraq Division One in the 2020–21 season, and two rounds before the end of the league, the team managed to maintain the top of the Group 1, and remained at the top of this group until the end of the league, where it qualified for the Iraqi Premier League for the first time, after collecting 30 points from 9 wins and 3 draw and one loss. In the final match, the team lost against Al-Sinaa 1–0 to take second place in the championship.

New International Stadium
In January 2021, the club president Lahur Talabany laid the foundation stone for the Newroz International Stadium in Sulaymaniyah. The new stadium can accommodate 14,500 spectators, and its construction will cost $12 million. It is hoped that the stadium will be completed in less than two years.

Current squad

First-team squad

Managerial history

  Wali Karim

Honours

Domestic

National
Iraq Division One
Runners-up (1): 2020–21

RegionalKurdistan Premier LeagueWinners (1):''' 2019–20

References

External links
 Iraq Clubs – Foundation Dates at the RSSSF

1994 establishments in Iraq
Association football clubs established in 1994
Football clubs in Sulaymaniyah
Sulaymaniyah